Below is the list of populated places in Bursa Province, Turkey by the districts. The first seven districts (Gemlik, Gürsu, Kestel, Mudanya, Nilüfer, Osmangazi, Yıldırım) are actually parts of Greater Bursa. The first place in each list is the administrative center of the district.

Gemlik 
 Gemlik
 Adliye, Gemlik
 Büyükkumla, Gemlik
 Cihatlı, Gemlik
 Engürücük, Gemlik
 Fevziye, Gemlik
 Fındıcak, Gemlik
 Güvenli, Gemlik
 Hamidiye, Gemlik
 Haydariye, Gemlik
 Karacaali, Gemlik
 Katırlı, Gemlik
 Kurtul, Gemlik
 Muratoba, Gemlik
 Narlı, Gemlik
 Şahinyurdu, Gemlik
 Şükriye, Gemlik
 Umurbey, Gemlik
 Yeniköy, Gemlik

Gürsu
 Gürsu
 Cambazlar, Gürsu
 Dışkaya, Gürsu
 Ericek, Gürsu
 İğdir, Gürsu
 Karahıdır, Gürsu
 Kazıklı, Gürsu

Kestel 
 Kestel
 Ağlaşan, Kestel
 Aksu, Kestel
 Alaçam, Kestel
 Babasultan, Kestel
 Burhaniye, Kestel
 Çataltepe, Kestel
 Derekızık, Kestel
 Dudaklı, Kestel
 Erdoğan, Kestel
 Gölbaşı, Kestel
 Gölcük, Kestel
 Gözede, Kestel
 Kayacık, Kestel
 Kozluören, Kestel
 Lütfiye, Kestel
 Narlıdere, Kestel
 Nüzhetiye, Kestel
 Orhaniye, Kestel
 Osmaniye, Kestel
 Saitabat, Kestel
 Sayfiye, Kestel
 Seymen, Kestel
 Soğuksu, Kestel
 Şevketiye, Kestel
 Şükraniye, Kestel
 Turanköy, Kestel
 Ümitalan, Kestel
 Yağmurlu, Kestel

Mudanya

 Mudanya
 Akköy, Mudanya
 Altıntaş, Mudanya
 Aydınpınar, Mudanya
 Balabancık, Mudanya
 Çağrışan, Mudanya
 Çamlık, Mudanya
 Çayönü, Mudanya
 Çekrice, Mudanya
 Çepni, Mudanya
 Çınarlı, Mudanya
 Dede, Mudanya
 Dere, Mudanya
 Eğerce, Mudanya
 Emirleryenicesi, Mudanya
 Esence, Mudanya
 Evciler, Mudanya
 Göynüklü, Mudanya
 Hançerli, Mudanya
 Işıklı, Mudanya
 İpekyayla, Mudanya
 Kaymakoba, Mudanya
 Kumyaka, Mudanya
 Küçükyenice, Mudanya
 Mesudiye, Mudanya
 Mirzaoba, Mudanya
 Mürsel, Mudanya
 Orhaniye, Mudanya
 Söğütpınar, Mudanya
 Yalıçiftlik, Mudanya
 Yaman, Mudanya
 Yaylacık, Mudanya
 Yörükali, Mudanya
 Yürükyenicesi, Mudanya
 Zeytinbağı, Mudanya

Nilüfer
 Nilüfer
 Atlas, Nilüfer
 Ayvaköy, Nilüfer
 Badırga, Nilüfer
 Başköy, Nilüfer
 Büyükbalıklı, Nilüfer
 Çatalağıl, Nilüfer
 Çaylı, Nilüfer
 Dağyenice, Nilüfer
 Doğanköy, Nilüfer
 Fadıllı, Nilüfer
 Güngören, Nilüfer
 İnegazi, Nilüfer
 Kadriye, Nilüfer
 Karacaoba, Nilüfer
 Konaklı, Nilüfer
 Korubaşı, Nilüfer
 Kuruçeşme, Nilüfer
 Makşempınarı, Nilüfer
 Tahtalı, Nilüfer
 Unçukuru, Nilüfer
 Üçpınar, Nilüfer
 Yaylacık, Nilüfer
 Yolçatı, Nilüfer

Osmangazi

 Osmangazi
 Ahmetbey, Osmangazi
 Aksungur, Osmangazi
 Avdancık, Osmangazi
 Bağlı, Osmangazi
 Büyükdeliller, Osmangazi
 Çağlıyan, Osmangazi
 Çaybaşı, Osmangazi
 Dağakçaköy, Osmangazi
 Doğancı, Osmangazi
 Dürdane, Osmangazi
 Gökçeören, Osmangazi
 Güneybayır, Osmangazi
 Güneybudaklar, Osmangazi
 Hüseyinalan, Osmangazi
 Karabalçık, Osmangazi
 Karaislah, Osmangazi
 Küçükdeliller, Osmangazi
 Mürseller, Osmangazi
 Nilüfer, Osmangazi
 Seç, Osmangazi
 Seferışıklar, Osmangazi
 Selçukgazi, Osmangazi
 Soğukpınar, Osmangazi
 Süleymaniye, Osmangazi
 Tuzaklı, Osmangazi
 Uluçam, Osmangazi
 Yiğitali, Osmangazi

Yıldırım

 Yıldırım
 Hamamlıkızık, Yıldırım

Büyükorhan

 Büyükorhan
 Akçasaz, Büyükorhan
 Aktaş, Büyükorhan
 Balaban, Büyükorhan
 Bayındır, Büyükorhan
 Burunca, Büyükorhan
 Çakıryenice, Büyükorhan
 Çeribaşı, Büyükorhan
 Çökene, Büyükorhan
 Danacılar, Büyükorhan
 Danaçalı, Büyükorhan
 Demirler, Büyükorhan
 Derecik, Büyükorhan
 Durhasan, Büyükorhan
 Düğüncüler, Büyükorhan
 Elekçalı, Büyükorhan
 Ericek, Büyükorhan
 Gedikler, Büyükorhan
 Geynik, Büyükorhan
 Hacıahmetler, Büyükorhan
 Hacılar, Büyükorhan
 Hemşeriler, Büyükorhan
 Karaağız, Büyükorhan
 Karaçukur, Büyükorhan
 Karalar, Büyükorhan
 Kayapa, Büyükorhan
 Kınık, Büyükorhan
 Kuşlar, Büyükorhan
 Mazlumlar, Büyükorhan
 Osmanlar, Büyükorhan
 Örencik, Büyükorhan
 Özlüce, Büyükorhan
 Perçin, Büyükorhan
 Pınarköy, Büyükorhan
 Piribeyler, Büyükorhan
 Sarnıç, Büyükorhan
 Tekerler, Büyükorhan
 Veletler, Büyükorhan
 Yenice, Büyükorhan
 Zaferiye, Büyükorhan

Harmancık
 Harmancık
 Akpınar, Harmancık
 Alutca, Harmancık
 Balatdanişment, Harmancık
 Bekdemirler, Harmancık
 Çakmak, Harmancık
 Çatalsöğüt, Harmancık
 Dedebali, Harmancık
 Delicegüney, Harmancık
 Dutluca, Harmancık
 Gedikören, Harmancık
 Gökçeler, Harmancık
 Gülözü, Harmancık
 Harmancık Akalan, Harmancık
 Hopandanişment, Harmancık
 Ilıcaksu, Harmancık
 İshaklar, Harmancık
 Kışmanlar, Harmancık
 Kocapınar, Harmancık
 Kozluca, Harmancık
 Nalbant, Harmancık
 Okçular, Harmancık
 Yeşilyurt, Harmancık

İnegöl
 İnegöl
 Akbaşlar, İnegöl
 Akıncılar, İnegöl
 Alibey, İnegöl
 Aşağıballık, İnegöl
 Babaoğlu, İnegöl
 Bahariye, İnegöl
 Bahçekaya, İnegöl
 Bayramşah, İnegöl
 Bilalköy, İnegöl
 Boğazköy, İnegöl
 Cerrah, İnegöl
 Çavuşköy, İnegöl
 Çaylıca, İnegöl
 Çayyaka, İnegöl
 Çeltikçi, İnegöl
 Çiftlikköy, İnegöl
 Çitli, İnegöl
 Deydinler, İnegöl
 Dipsizgöl, İnegöl
 Doğanyurdu, İnegöl
 Dömez, İnegöl
 Edebey, İnegöl
 Elmaçayır, İnegöl
 Esenköy, İnegöl
 Eskikaracakaya, İnegöl
 Eskiköy, İnegöl
 Eymir, İnegöl
 Fevziye, İnegöl
 Fındıklı, İnegöl
 Gedikpınar, İnegöl
 Gülbahçe, İnegöl
 Gündüzlü, İnegöl
 Güneykestane, İnegöl
 Güzelyurt, İnegöl
 Hacıkara, İnegöl
 Halhalca, İnegöl
 Hamamlı, İnegöl
 Hamidiye, İnegöl
 Hamitabat, İnegöl
 Hamzabey, İnegöl
 Hasanpaşa, İnegöl
 Hayriye, İnegöl
 Hilmiye, İnegöl
 Hocaköy, İnegöl
 İclaliye, İnegöl
 İhsaniye, İnegöl
 İnayet, İnegöl
 İsaören, İnegöl
 İskaniye, İnegöl
 Karagölet, İnegöl
 Karahasanlar, İnegöl
 Karakadı, İnegöl
 Karalar, İnegöl
 Kayapınar, İnegöl
 Kestanealan, İnegöl
 Kınık, İnegöl
 Kıran, İnegöl
 Kocakonak, İnegöl
 Konurlar, İnegöl
 Kozluca, İnegöl
 Kulaca, İnegöl
 Kurşunlu, İnegöl
 Küçükyenice, İnegöl
 Lütfiye, İnegöl
 Madenköy, İnegöl
 Mesruriye, İnegöl
 Mezit, İnegöl
 Muratbey, İnegöl
 Olukman, İnegöl
 Ortaköy, İnegöl
 Osmaniye, İnegöl
 Özlüce, İnegöl
 Paşaören, İnegöl
 Rüştiye, İnegöl
 Saadet, İnegöl
 Sarıpınar, İnegöl
 Soğukdere, İnegöl
 Sulhiye, İnegöl
 Sultaniye, İnegöl
 Sungurpaşa, İnegöl
 Süle, İnegöl
 Sülüklügöl, İnegöl
 Süpürtü, İnegöl
 Şehitler, İnegöl
 Şipali, İnegöl
 Tahtaköprü, İnegöl
 Tekkeköy, İnegöl
 Tokuş, İnegöl
 Turgutalp, İnegöl
 Tüfekçikonak, İnegöl
 Yeniceköy, İnegöl
 Yeniköy, İnegöl
 Yeniyörük, İnegöl
 Yiğit, İnegöl
 Yukarıballık, İnegöl

İznik
 İznik
 Aydınlar, İznik
 Bayındır, İznik
 Boyalıca, İznik
 Candarlı, İznik
 Çakırca, İznik
 Çamdibi, İznik
 Çamoluk, İznik
 Çiçekli, İznik
 Derbent, İznik
 Dereköy, İznik
 Dırazali, İznik
 Elbeyli, İznik
 Elmalı, İznik
 Göllüce, İznik
 Gürmüzlü, İznik
 Hacıosman, İznik
 Hisardere, İznik
 Hocaköy, İznik
 İhsaniye, İznik
 İnikli, İznik
 Karatekin, İznik
 Kaynarca, İznik
 Kırıntı, İznik
 Kutluca, İznik
 Mahmudiye, İznik
 Mecidiye, İznik
 Mustafalı, İznik
 Müşküle, İznik
 Nüzhetiye, İznik
 Orhaniye, İznik
 Osmaniye, İznik
 Ömerli, İznik
 Sansarak, İznik
 Sarıağıl, İznik
 Süleymaniye, İznik
 Şerefiye, İznik
 Tacir, İznik
 Yenişerefiye, İznik
 Yürükler, İznik

Karacabey
 Karacabey
 Akçakoyun, Karacabey
 Akçasusurluk, Karacabey
 Akhisar, Karacabey
 Arız, Karacabey
 Bakır, Karacabey
 Ballıkaya, Karacabey
 Bayramdere, Karacabey
 Beylik, Karacabey
 Boğaz, Karacabey
 Canbaz, Karacabey
 Çamlıca, Karacabey
 Çarık, Karacabey
 Çavuş, Karacabey
 Çeşnigir, Karacabey
 Dağesemen, Karacabey
 Dağkadı, Karacabey
 Danişment, Karacabey
 Doğla, Karacabey
 Ekinli, Karacabey
 Ekmekçi, Karacabey
 Eskikaraağaç, Karacabey
 Eskisarıbey, Karacabey
 Fevzipaşa, Karacabey
 Gölecik, Karacabey
 Gölkıyı, Karacabey
 Gönü, Karacabey
 Güngörmez, Karacabey
 Hamidiye, Karacabey
 Harmanlı, Karacabey
 Hayırlar, Karacabey
 Hotanlı, Karacabey
 Hürriyet, Karacabey
 İkizce, Karacabey
 İnkaya, Karacabey
 İsmetpaşa, Karacabey
 Karakoca, Karacabey
 Karasu, Karacabey
 Kedikaya, Karacabey
 Keşlik, Karacabey
 Kıranlar, Karacabey
 Kulakpınar, Karacabey
 Kurşunlu, Karacabey
 Küçükkaraağaç, Karacabey
 Muratlı, Karacabey
 Okçular, Karacabey
 Orhaniye, Karacabey
 Ortasarıbey, Karacabey
 Ovaesemen, Karacabey
 Örencik, Karacabey
 Sazlıca, Karacabey
 Seyran, Karacabey
 Subaşı, Karacabey
 Sultaniye, Karacabey
 Şahinköy, Karacabey
 Şahmelek, Karacabey
 Taşlık, Karacabey
 Taşpınar, Karacabey
 Tophisar, Karacabey
 Uluabat, Karacabey
 Yarış, Karacabey
 Yenikaraağaç, Karacabey
 Yenisarıbey, Karacabey
 Yeşildere, Karacabey
 Yolağzı, Karacabey

Keles
 Keles
 Akçapınar, Keles
 Alpağut, Keles
 Avdan, Keles
 Baraklı, Keles
 Basak, Keles
 Belenören, Keles
 Bıyıklıalanı, Keles
 Çayören, Keles
 Dağ Demirciler, Keles
 Dağdibi, Keles
 Davutlar, Keles
 Dedeler, Keles
 Delice, Keles
 Denizler, Keles
 Durak, Keles
 Düvenli, Keles
 Epçeler, Keles
 Gelemiç, Keles
 Gököz, Keles
 Harmanalanı, Keles
 Harmancık Demirci, Keles
 Haydar, Keles
 Issızören, Keles
 Karaardıç, Keles
 Kemaliye, Keles
 Kıran Işıklar, Keles
 Koca Kovacık, Keles
 Kozbudaklar, Keles
 Menteşe, Keles
 Pınarcık, Keles
 Sorgun, Keles
 Uzunöz, Keles
 Yağcılar, Keles
 Yazıbaşı, Keles
 Yunuslar, Keles

Mustafakemalpaşa

 Mustafakemalpaşa
 Adaköy, Mustafakemalpaşa
 Ağaçlı, Mustafakemalpaşa
 Akarca, Mustafakemalpaşa
 Akçapınar, Mustafakemalpaşa
 Alacaat, Mustafakemalpaşa
 Aliseydi, Mustafakemalpaşa
 Alpağut, Mustafakemalpaşa
 Aralık, Mustafakemalpaşa
 Aşağıbalı, Mustafakemalpaşa
 Ayaz, Mustafakemalpaşa
 Bahariye, Mustafakemalpaşa
 Behram, Mustafakemalpaşa
 Boğaz, Mustafakemalpaşa
 Bostandere, Mustafakemalpaşa
 Bük, Mustafakemalpaşa
 Camandar, Mustafakemalpaşa
 Çakallar, Mustafakemalpaşa
 Çaltılıbük, Mustafakemalpaşa
 Çamlıca, Mustafakemalpaşa
 Çardakbelen, Mustafakemalpaşa
 Çavuş, Mustafakemalpaşa
 Çeltikçi, Mustafakemalpaşa
 Çiviliçam, Mustafakemalpaşa
 Çömlekçi, Mustafakemalpaşa
 Çördük, Mustafakemalpaşa
 Dallıca, Mustafakemalpaşa
 Demirdere, Mustafakemalpaşa
 Demireli, Mustafakemalpaşa
 Derecik, Mustafakemalpaşa
 Derekadı, Mustafakemalpaşa
 Devecikonağı, Mustafakemalpaşa
 Doğanalan, Mustafakemalpaşa
 Doğancı, Mustafakemalpaşa
 Dorak, Mustafakemalpaşa
 Döllük, Mustafakemalpaşa
 Durumtay, Mustafakemalpaşa
 Eskibalçık, Mustafakemalpaşa
 Eskikızılelma, Mustafakemalpaşa
 Fındıcak, Mustafakemalpaşa
 Garipçetekke, Mustafakemalpaşa
 Güller, Mustafakemalpaşa
 Güllüce, Mustafakemalpaşa
 Gündoğdu, Mustafakemalpaşa
 Güveçdere, Mustafakemalpaşa
 Güvem, Mustafakemalpaşa
 Hacıahmet, Mustafakemalpaşa
 Hacıali, Mustafakemalpaşa
 Hamidiye, Mustafakemalpaşa
 Hisaraltı, Mustafakemalpaşa
 Işıklar, Mustafakemalpaşa
 İlyasçılar, Mustafakemalpaşa
 İncealipınar, Mustafakemalpaşa
 İncilipınar, Mustafakemalpaşa
 Kabulbaba, Mustafakemalpaşa
 Kadirçeşme, Mustafakemalpaşa
 Kapaklıoluk, Mustafakemalpaşa
 Karacalar, Mustafakemalpaşa
 Karaköy, Mustafakemalpaşa
 Karaoğlan, Mustafakemalpaşa
 Karaorman, Mustafakemalpaşa
 Karapınar, Mustafakemalpaşa
 Kayabaşı, Mustafakemalpaşa
 Kazanpınar, Mustafakemalpaşa
 Keltaş, Mustafakemalpaşa
 Kestelek, Mustafakemalpaşa
 Killik, Mustafakemalpaşa
 Kocakoru, Mustafakemalpaşa
 Kosova, Mustafakemalpaşa
 Koşuboğazı, Mustafakemalpaşa
 Kömürcükadı, Mustafakemalpaşa
 Körekem, Mustafakemalpaşa
 Kösehoroz, Mustafakemalpaşa
 Kumkadı, Mustafakemalpaşa
 Kurşunlu, Mustafakemalpaşa
 Lütfiye, Mustafakemalpaşa
 Melik, Mustafakemalpaşa
 Muradiyesarnıç, Mustafakemalpaşa
 Ocaklı, Mustafakemalpaşa
 Onaç, Mustafakemalpaşa
 Orhaniye, Mustafakemalpaşa
 Ormankadı, Mustafakemalpaşa
 Osmaniye, Mustafakemalpaşa
 Ovaazatlı, Mustafakemalpaşa
 Ömeraltı, Mustafakemalpaşa
 Paşalar, Mustafakemalpaşa
 Sarımustafalar, Mustafakemalpaşa
 Sincansarnıç, Mustafakemalpaşa
 Soğucak, Mustafakemalpaşa
 Soğukpınar, Mustafakemalpaşa
 Söğütalan, Mustafakemalpaşa
 Sünlük, Mustafakemalpaşa
 Şapçı, Mustafakemalpaşa
 Şehriman, Mustafakemalpaşa
 Taşköprü, Mustafakemalpaşa
 Taşpınar, Mustafakemalpaşa
 Tatkavaklı, Mustafakemalpaşa
 Tepecik, Mustafakemalpaşa
 Tırnova, Mustafakemalpaşa
 Uğurlupınar, Mustafakemalpaşa
 Üçbeyli, Mustafakemalpaşa
 Yalıntaş, Mustafakemalpaşa
 Yamanlı, Mustafakemalpaşa
 Yaylaçayır, Mustafakemalpaşa
 Yenibalçık, Mustafakemalpaşa
 Yenice, Mustafakemalpaşa
 Yenikızılelma, Mustafakemalpaşa
 Yeşilova, Mustafakemalpaşa
 Yoncaağaç, Mustafakemalpaşa
 Yukarıbalı, Mustafakemalpaşa
 Yumurcaklı, Mustafakemalpaşa

Orhaneli
 Orhaneli
 Ağaçhisar, Orhaneli
 Akalan, Orhaneli
 Akçabük, Orhaneli
 Altıntaş, Orhaneli
 Argın, Orhaneli
 Balıoğlu, Orhaneli
 Başköy, Orhaneli
 Belenoluk, Orhaneli
 Celepler, Orhaneli
 Çeki, Orhaneli
 Çınarcık, Orhaneli
 Çivili, Orhaneli
 Çöreler, Orhaneli
 Dağgüney, Orhaneli
 Deliballılar, Orhaneli
 Demirci, Orhaneli
 Dere, Orhaneli
 Dündar, Orhaneli
 Emir, Orhaneli
 Erenler, Orhaneli
 Eskidanişment, Orhaneli
 Fadıl, Orhaneli
 Firoz, Orhaneli
 Gazioluk, Orhaneli
 Girencik, Orhaneli
 Göktepe, Orhaneli
 Göynükbelen, Orhaneli
 Gümüşpınar, Orhaneli
 İkizoluk, Orhaneli
 Kabaklar, Orhaneli
 Kadı, Orhaneli
 Karaoğlanlar, Orhaneli
 Karasi, Orhaneli
 Karıncalı, Orhaneli
 Koçu, Orhaneli
 Kusumlar, Orhaneli
 Küçükorhan, Orhaneli
 Letafet, Orhaneli
 Mahaller, Orhaneli
 Nalınlar, Orhaneli
 Orta, Orhaneli
 Osmaniyeçatak, Orhaneli
 Sadağı, Orhaneli
 Semerci, Orhaneli
 Serçeler, Orhaneli
 Sırıl, Orhaneli
 Söğüt, Orhaneli
 Süleymanbey, Orhaneli
 Şükriye, Orhaneli
 Tepecik, Orhaneli
 Topuk, Orhaneli
 Yakuplar, Orhaneli
 Yenidanişment, Orhaneli
 Yeşiller, Orhaneli
 Yörücekler, Orhaneli

Orhangazi

 Orhangazi
 Akharem, Orhangazi
 Bayırköy, Orhangazi
 Cihanköy, Orhangazi
 Çakırlı, Orhangazi
 Çeltikçi, Orhangazi
 Dutluca, Orhangazi
 Fındıklı, Orhangazi
 Gedelek, Orhangazi
 Gemiç, Orhangazi
 Gölyaka, Orhangazi
 Gürle, Orhangazi
 Hamzalı, Orhangazi
 Heceler, Orhangazi
 Karsak, Orhangazi
 Keramet, Orhangazi
 Mahmudiye, Orhangazi
 Narlıca, Orhangazi
 Ortaköy, Orhangazi
 Örnekköy, Orhangazi
 Paşapınar, Orhangazi
 Sölöz, Orhangazi
 Üreğil, Orhangazi
 Yenigürle, Orhangazi
 Yeniköy, Orhangazi
 Yenisölöz, Orhangazi

Yenişehir

 Yenişehir
 Afşar, Yenişehir
 Akbıyık, Yenişehir
 Akçapınar, Yenişehir
 Akdere, Yenişehir
 Alaylı, Yenişehir
 Ayaz, Yenişehir
 Aydoğdu, Yenişehir
 Barcın, Yenişehir
 Beypınar, Yenişehir
 Burcun, Yenişehir
 Cihadiye, Yenişehir
 Çamönü, Yenişehir
 Çardak, Yenişehir
 Çayırlı, Yenişehir
 Çelebi, Yenişehir
 Çeltikçi, Yenişehir
 Çiçeközü, Yenişehir
 Demirboğa, Yenişehir
 Dere, Yenişehir
 Ebe, Yenişehir
 Eyerce, Yenişehir
 Fethiye, Yenişehir
 Gökçesu, Yenişehir
 Günece, Yenişehir
 Hayriye, Yenişehir
 İncirli, Yenişehir
 Kara, Yenişehir
 Karaamca, Yenişehir
 Karabahadır, Yenişehir
 Karacaahmet, Yenişehir
 Karacaali, Yenişehir
 Karasıl, Yenişehir
 Kavaklı, Yenişehir
 Kıblepınar, Yenişehir
 Kızıl, Yenişehir
 Kızılhisar, Yenişehir
 Kirazlıyayla, Yenişehir
 Koyunhisar, Yenişehir
 Kozdere, Yenişehir
 Köprühisar, Yenişehir
 Mahmudiye, Yenişehir
 Marmaracık, Yenişehir
 Mecidiye, Yenişehir
 Menteşe, Yenişehir
 Orhaniye, Yenişehir
 Osmaniye, Yenişehir
 Papatya, Yenişehir
 Paşayayla, Yenişehir
 Reşadiye, Yenişehir
 Selimiye, Yenişehir
 Söylemiş, Yenişehir
 Subaşı, Yenişehir
 Süleymaniye, Yenişehir
 Terziler, Yenişehir
 Toprakdere, Yenişehir
 Toprakocak, Yenişehir
 Yarhisar, Yenişehir
 Yazılı, Yenişehir
 Yeni, Yenişehir
 Yıldırım, Yenişehir
 Yolören, Yenişehir

Recent development

According to Law act no 6360, all Turkish provinces with a population more than 750 000, were renamed as metropolitan municipality. All districts in those provinces became second level municipalities and all villages in those districts  were renamed as a neighborhoods . Thus the villages listed above are officially neighborhoods of Bursa.

References

Bursa
List